Hi-Five was an Israeli boy band that operated from 1996 to 2000. Amir Fryszer Guttman was the lead. The other members of the band included: Eyal Shahar, Michael Harpaz, Idan Yaskin and Eyal Desau.

Hi-Five released three studio albums and one mini-album. All went gold in Israel with tens of thousands of copies sold. Hi-Five also won the Festigal twice.

Amir Fryszer Guttman drowned on July 22, 2017, while saving his niece.

Discography 

 Hi Fave (1997)
 an island. times. Party Time (1997)
 Everyone Dances Now (1998)
 Take 1 + 2 (1999)
 The Last (2000)

Hits 

 I (1997)
 Cloudy Day (1997)
 Allow Love (1997)
 We Have Nothing to Lose (1997)
 Far Far (1997)
 Glory (1997)
 Party Time (1997)
 Press (1998)
 Everyone Dances Now (1998)
 The Temple of Love
 (1998) Give Me A Hfive
 Children of the Nineties (1998)
 Screaming Love (1998)
 Little is the most fun in the world (1998)
 Free and happy ( Cabar, 1999)
 Continues to Walk (1999)
 Standing on a Cliff (1999)
 Confused Relationships (1999)
 Honey (1999)
 Who Said + Hi Fave Remix (1999)
 Dream Forever (Cabar, 2000)
 Catch the World (2000)

References 

Boy bands
Musical groups established in 1996
Musical groups disestablished in 2000